Pic Macaya (Macaya Peak) is the second-highest mountain in Haiti (after Pic la Selle), rising to an elevation of  above sea level. The mountain is located in the Pic Macaya National Park.

Pic Macaya is a source of water generation and has rich soil that support its dense pine forests. It has a high concentration of biodiversity with numerous endemic species and is also a nesting location for the endangered Black-capped petrel.

See also
Pic Macaya National Park
List of national parks of Haiti
List of Ultras of the Caribbean

References

External links
 "Pic Macaya, Haiti" on Peakbagger

Mountains of Haiti
Mountains of the Caribbean